Yao is a town in Chad and the capital of the Fitri department.

Yao is also the name of a pre-colonial Sultanate in the same area. See the Bulala people.

References

Populated places in Chad
Batha Region